The 1885 New South Wales colonial election was held between 16 October and 31 October 1885. This election was for all of the 122 seats in the New South Wales Legislative Assembly and it was conducted in 37 single-member constituencies, 24 2-member constituencies, seven 3-member constituencies and four 4-member constituencies, all with a first past the post system. Suffrage was limited to adult male British subjects, resident in New South Wales. The previous parliament of New South Wales was dissolved on 7 October 1885 by the Governor, Lord Augustus Loftus, on the advice of the Premier, George Dibbs.

There was no recognisable party structure at this election, the last election for which this was the case; instead the government was determined by a loose, shifting factional system. Dibbs had succeeded Alexander Stuart two weeks before the election was held, and maintained a fragile grip on power after the election until 22 December, when he was defeated by Sir John Robertson.

Key dates

Results
{{Australian elections/Title row
| table style = float:right;clear:right;margin-left:1em;
| title        = New South Wales colonial election, 16 – 31 October 1885
| house        = Legislative Assembly
| series       = New South Wales colonial election
| back         = 1882
| forward      = 1887
| enrolled     = 
| total_votes  = 129,888
| turnout %    = 61.10
| turnout chg  = +4.41
| informal     = 2,669
| informal %   = 2.01
| informal chg = −0.09
}}

|}

References

See also
 Members of the New South Wales Legislative Assembly, 1885–1887
 Candidates of the 1885 New South Wales colonial election

1885
1885 elections in Australia
1880s in New South Wales
October 1885 events